JVC Cuijk is a Dutch association football club from Cuijk, Netherlands. The club was founded in 1931 and plays in Derde Divisie, the fourth tier of Dutch football, in the Sunday league.

The team plays home games at Sportpark De Groenendijkse, which seats 3,000 spectators.

Current squad

Honours

Hoofdklasse Zondag: 2 (2001, 2007)
KNVB District Cup: 2 (2011, 2014).

References

External links 
 JVC Cuijk Official site

Football clubs in the Netherlands
Association football clubs established in 1931
1931 establishments in the Netherlands
Football clubs in North Brabant
Sport in Cuijk